John Milton, a 1,444-ton vessel built in Fairhaven, Massachusetts, was wrecked on February 20, 1858 5 nautical miles (9 km) west of the Montauk Lighthouse, killing all 32 or 33 people on board, in one of the worst maritime disasters off the east coast of  on Long Island, New York.

Built in 1854, John Milton was captained by Ephraim Harding of Martha's Vineyard, with its home port at New Bedford, Massachusetts. The 43-year-old Harding was born in New Bedford. Also on board was the captain's teenage son, Rudolphus Hancock Harding.

The ship left New York City on December 6, 1856. After loading a cargo of guano at the Chincha Islands in the Pacific Ocean off the coast of Peru, she returned to the United States from South America, stopping at Norfolk, Virginia, on February 14, 1858. She sailed northeast two days later, presumably heading for New York City. Captain Harding may have confused the Shinnecock Lighthouse at Ponquogue Point in Hampton Bays, which had been erected in his absence, for the Montauk Light, and ran aground off the shore at what is known today as "Ditch Plains".

The frozen bodies of 24 sailors washed ashore and were buried at the South End Burying Ground in East Hampton, New York, where there is a marble monument today. Harding's body was identified, but his son's was never found. Capt. Harding's body was returned home and is buried in the Village Cemetery in Vineyard Haven, MA.

References 

Maritime incidents in February 1858
Ships built in New Bedford, Massachusetts
Guano trade
Shipwrecks of the New York (state) coast
1854 ships